Khams Tibetan is the Tibetic language used by the majority of the people in Kham. Khams is one of the three branches of the traditional classification of Tibetic languages (the other two being Amdo Tibetan and Ü-Tsang). In terms of mutual intelligibility, Khams could communicate at a basic level with the Ü-Tsang branch (including Lhasa Tibetan).

Both Khams Tibetan and Lhasa Tibetan evolve to not preserve the word-initial consonant clusters, which makes them very far from Classical Tibetan, especially when compared to the more conservative Amdo Tibetan. Also, Kham and Lhasa Tibetan evolved to be tonal, which Classical Tibetan was not.

Distribution
Kham Tibetan is spoken in Kham, which is now divided between the eastern part of Tibet Autonomous Region, the southern part of Qinghai, the western part of Sichuan, and the northwestern part of Yunnan, China.

Khampa Tibetan is also spoken by about 1,000 people in two enclaves in eastern Bhutan, the descendants of pastoral yak-herding communities.

Dialects
There are five dialects of Khams Tibetan proper:

 Central Khams, spoken in Dêgê County and Chamdo
 Southern Khams, spoken in the Dêqên Tibetan Autonomous Prefecture. There are several subdialects due to the mountainous terrain, as well as contact with neighboring language communities for trade.
 Northern or Northeastern Khams, spoken in Nangqên County and Yushu Tibetan Autonomous Prefecture
 Eastern Khams, spoken in Kangding
 Hor, or Western Khams, spoken in Nagqu Prefecture
 The Gêrzê dialect is sometimes considered Western Khams

These have relatively low mutual intelligibility, but are close enough that they are usually considered a single language.  Khamba and Tseku are more divergent, but classified with Khams by Tournadre (2013).  

Several other languages are spoken by Tibetans in the Khams region: Dongwang Tibetan language and the Rgyalrong languages.

The phonologies and vocabularies of the Bodgrong, Dartsendo, dGudzong, Khyungpo (Khromtshang), Lhagang Rangakha, Sangdam, Sogpho, sKobsteng, sPomtserag, Tsharethong, and Yangthang dialects of Kham Tibetan have been documented by Hiroyuki Suzuki.

Phonology

Consonants 

  before front vowels  are realized as palatal fricatives .
 Palatal plosives  are included in the consonant inventory of the dGudzong dialect, but these sound values may include a phonetic variant of palatalised velar plosives. The velar plosive series generally do not include a phonetic variant of palatal plosives. These two series, therefore, are still distinctive, but it is supposed that they may merge into velar ones in the near future.
  are heard as plosives  in the dGudzong dialect of the rGyalrong area.
  may also be heard as a voiceless lateral  in free variation.

Vowels 

  are realized as sounds  before a glottal stop .

See also
Standard Tibetan
Balti language
Languages of Bhutan

References

Further reading
Suzuki, Hiroyuki and Sonam Wangmo. 2015. Discovering endangered Tibetic varieties in the easternmost Tibetosphere: A case study on Dartsendo Tibetan. Linguistics of the Tibeto-Burman Area 38:2 (2015), 256–270.

External links 
A Bibliography of Tibetan Linguistics
A grammar of the Tibetan Dege (Sde dge) dialect (Introduction) - Häsler, Katrin Louise. 1999.
The Tibetan Language School of Sichuan Province
www.zangthal.co.uk Kham dialect notes

Bodic languages
Languages of Tibet
Languages of China
Languages written in Tibetan script
Languages of Bhutan